Jonathan Mark Richard Baker (born 6 October 1966) is a bishop of the Church of England. He is currently the suffragan Bishop of Fulham (providing alternative episcopal oversight in the dioceses of London, Southwark and Rochester) and was formerly the Bishop of Ebbsfleet (a provincial episcopal visitor).

Early life and education
Baker was born on 6 October 1966, and is the son of Sir John William Baker. He was educated at Merchant Taylors' School, Northwood, an all-boys public school in Hertfordshire. He studied at St John's College, Oxford. He trained for ordination at St Stephen's House, Oxford.

Ordained ministry
Baker was ordained in the Church of England as a deacon in 1993 and as a priest in 1994. He was an assistant curate at All Saints' Ascot Heath from 1993 to 1996. He was then priest in charge of St Mark's Reading and Vicar of Holy Trinity, Reading. From 2002 until 2013, he was Principal of Pusey House.

Baker has been Guild Vicar of St Andrew Holborn in the City of London since 2015.

Episcopal ministry
Following his appointment as the suffragan Bishop of Ebbsfleet, the provincial episcopal visitor for the western half of the Province of Canterbury, Baker was consecrated as a bishop at Southwark Cathedral on 16 June 2011. His appointment as an assistant bishop in the Diocese of Bath and Wells (an honorary role which facilitates his oversight of parishes in that diocese) was announced in September 2011. He was legally translated to the See of Fulham on 13 February 2013, began his episcopal ministry on 15 April and was installed at St Paul's Cathedral on 23 April (St George's Day).

Views
From 2010 to 2014, Baker was the chairman of Forward in Faith, a traditionalist Anglo-Catholic membership organisation which supports and finances the work of The Society under the patronage of S. Wilfrid and S. Hilda. In 2014, he announced that he would not stand for re-election as chairman of Forward in Faith UK. He is a member of the Council of Bishops of The Society.

In 2023, following the news that the House of Bishop's of the Church of England was to introduce proposals for blessing same-sex relationships, he signed an open letter which stated:

Personal life
Baker was previously a Freemason. While a student at Oxford University, he joined the Apollo University Lodge, a masonic lodge associated with the university, and served as its Worshipful Master. He held the senior position of Deputy Grand Chaplain in the United Grand Lodge of England. After twenty years membership, he left the organisation upon being appointed a bishop, stating that the criticism from some members of General Synod threatened to overshadow the inauguration of his episcopal ministry.

In a letter dated 22 October 2014, Baker wrote to his clergy informing them that he had been given permission by Richard Chartres, Bishop of London, and Justin Welby, Archbishop of Canterbury, to remarry following divorce. Until 2010, Church of England clergy who had been divorced and remarried could not become bishops. American religion commentator and Episcopal Priest, The Rev. George Conger, wrote, "They [traditionalist clergy] are at a loss to understand how the bishop dedicated to providing pastoral support for traditionalists can himself adopt a stance at odds with the position of most traditionalists – and at odds with the public position taken by Forward in Faith on divorce and remarriage."

Styles
 Mr Jonathan Baker (1966–1993) 
 The Reverend Jonathan Baker (1993–2011)
 The Right Reverend Jonathan Baker (2011–present)

References

|-

1966 births
Living people
People educated at Merchant Taylors' School, Northwood
Alumni of St John's College, Oxford
Alumni of St Stephen's House, Oxford
Bishops of Ebbsfleet
Bishops of Fulham
21st-century Church of England bishops
Anglo-Catholic bishops
Freemasons of the United Grand Lodge of England
Clergy of Pusey House, Oxford
English Anglo-Catholics